Albert "Arthur" Hartshorne (December 1880 – 10 February 1915) was an English footballer who played in the Football League for Burslem Port Vale and Stoke, and in the Southern League for Northampton Town and Southampton.

Career
Hartshorne played for Moxley White Star and Wolverhampton Wanderers, before joining Port Vale in June 1902. He was a regular throughout the 1902–03 season, scoring three goals in 28 Second Division appearances. He was sold to local rivals Stoke in April 1903 to ease Vale's financial troubles. At the Victoria Ground, Hartshorne played as a regular in the 1903–04 and 1904–05 campaigns, and was fast becoming a popular player with the supporters due to his 'hard yet controlled' tackling skill. He made 53 First Division appearances for the "Potters". It came as a disappointment then when he was sold to Southampton in the summer of 1905. He helped the "Saints" to claim a second-place finish in the Southern League in 1905–06 and was an ever-present in their run to the quarter-finals of the FA Cup. He later played for Southern League rivals Northampton Town.

Later life
Hartshorne became a tool-maker after the end of his football career. At the outbreak of the First World War, he enlisted in the Staffordshire Regiment. He died of wounds on 10 February 1915 and was buried at Boulogne Eastern Cemetery.

Style of play
Hartshorne was a "well-built" and pacey left-back who boasted good ball-control skills.

Career statistics
Source:

References

1880 births
1915 deaths
People from Darlaston
English footballers
Association football fullbacks
Wolverhampton Wanderers F.C. players
Port Vale F.C. players
Stoke City F.C. players
Southampton F.C. players
Northampton Town F.C. players
English Football League players
Southern Football League players
Staffordshire Regiment soldiers
British Army personnel of World War I
British military personnel killed in World War I
Military personnel from Staffordshire
Burials in France